Berrier is a surname. Notable people with the surname include:

Jean Berrier (1766–1824), French playwright
Bill Berrier (20th century), minor league baseball manager
Ed Berrier (born 1961), second-generation NASCAR driver
Franck Berrier (1984–2021), French football player
Todd Berrier (21st century), NASCAR crew chief

See also
Berryer